Shaaban Hassan Kado (born 14 April 1989) is a Tanzanian football goalkeeper who plays for Mtibwa Sugar.

References

1989 births
Living people
Tanzanian footballers
Tanzania international footballers
Mtibwa Sugar F.C. players
Young Africans S.C. players
Coastal Union F.C. players
Mwadui United F.C. players
Association football goalkeepers
Tanzanian Premier League players